My Beautiful Kingdom (Chinese: 我的美丽王国) is a 2013 Chinese romance-comedy film on RED by HBO directed by Mak Wing-lun and starring Jiro Wang, Chrissie Chau and Chen Han-dian.

Cast
 Jiro Wang
 Chrissie Chau
 Chen Han-dian

References

2013 films
Chinese romantic comedy films
2013 romantic comedy films
2010s Mandarin-language films